The Cebu Coliseum is an indoor arena in Cebu City, Philippines. Its seating capacity is around 5,000. The coliseum hosts various sports events and concerts in Cebu and is the primary venue for CESAFI games. It was also the home of the Cebu Gems of the defunct MBA. On August 4, 1962, one of the first events it hosted was a fight between hometown hero Gabriel "Flash" Elorde and Japanese boxer Terou Kosaka. It was their second of their four fights in a span of 4 years (1961-1965). On March 24, 1979, the first National Arnis Championships. It has also become a regular venue for selected on-tour games in the Philippine Basketball Association (PBA) since 1975 and also host of the 1982 PBA All-Star Series, 1998 PBA All-Star Weekend and 2004 PBA All-Star Weekend.

See also
 University of Cebu
 Cebu City Sports Complex
 List of venues played by the Philippine Basketball Association

References

Buildings and structures in Cebu City
Indoor arenas in the Philippines
Venues of the 2005 Southeast Asian Games
Basketball venues in the Philippines
Sports in Cebu
Sports venues completed in 1962
1962 establishments in the Philippines